Now That's What I Call Music! 8 may refer to at least two different "Now That's What I Call Music!"-series albums, including
 Now That's What I Call Music 8 (original UK series, 1986 release)
 Now That's What I Call Music! 8 (U.S. series, 2001 release)